is a Japanese sprinter. He competed in the men's 100 metres at the 1988 Summer Olympics.

References

1967 births
Living people
Place of birth missing (living people)
Japanese male sprinters
Olympic male sprinters
Olympic athletes of Japan
Athletes (track and field) at the 1988 Summer Olympics
Japan Championships in Athletics winners
20th-century Japanese people
21st-century Japanese people